Jonathan Sebastián Maza (born 1 October 1998) is an Argentine professional footballer who plays as a midfielder for Club Atlético Ituzaingó.

Career
Maza began his career with Deportivo Español. He appeared for his professional debut on 26 February 2018 versus San Miguel, coming off the pitch for Emanuel Escuredo after fifty-three minutes. Twenty-six further appearances followed in Primera B Metropolitana, which culminated with the midfielder netting his first senior goal in a win away to Sacachispas in April 2019; in 2018–19, as they suffered relegation to tier four.

Personal life
In July 2020, it was confirmed that Maza had tested positive for COVID-19 amid the pandemic.

Career statistics
.

References

External links

1998 births
Living people
Footballers from Buenos Aires
Argentine footballers
Association football midfielders
Primera B Metropolitana players
Primera C Metropolitana players
Deportivo Español footballers